, is a major office development by Mori Building in Nishi-ku, Kumamoto, Kumamoto Prefecture, Japan, located in front of Kumamoto Station.

The Kumamoto station reconstruction project is currently in progress, specifically for the full opening of the Kyushu Shinkansen.

Facilities
Building A (Kumamoto Shintoshin Plaza)
Kumamoto Shintoshin Plaza Hall (5F/6F)
Business Support Center (4F)
Plaza Library (3F/4F)
Sightseeing and Regional Information Center (2F)
Commercial facilities (1F)
Building B
Reserved for right holders
Building C
The Kumamoto Tower

History
October 1, 2011: Open for business. 
Spring 2012: The Kumamoto Tower will be completed.

References

External links
Kumamoto Shintoshin Official Website 
Kumamoto Shintoshin - Mori Urban Planning Corporation Official Website 

Buildings and structures in Kumamoto
Office buildings in Japan